József Csatári (17 December 1943 – 30 January 2021) was a Hungarian wrestler. He was born in Budapest. He was Olympic bronze medalist in Freestyle wrestling in 1968 and in 1972. He won a silver medal at the 1970 World Wrestling Championships. He died on 30 January 2021.

References

External links 
 
 
 

1943 births
2021 deaths
Martial artists from Budapest
Hungarian male sport wrestlers
Olympic wrestlers of Hungary
Wrestlers at the 1968 Summer Olympics
Wrestlers at the 1972 Summer Olympics
Olympic bronze medalists for Hungary
Olympic medalists in wrestling
Medalists at the 1968 Summer Olympics
Medalists at the 1972 Summer Olympics
20th-century Hungarian people
21st-century Hungarian people